Rafat Saeed Qureshi is an Urdu writer hailing from Aurangabad, Maharashtra. He has written more than a 100 articles, features, reviews and translated stories from English to Urdu. His work are mostly on culture, tourism, history and monuments. An activist in the field of history and monuments, Qureshi has promoted Aurangabad at the national level through his Radio talks on Akashwani (All India Radio). He is also a regular talker on Akashwani. He has also conducted series of talks on various monuments of India.

Biography 

Rafat Qureshi comes from a traditional Handicraft family of Himroo. His father Abdul Hameed Qureshi owned a Himroo showroom and factory which was the only tourist shopping attraction from 1900 to late 1990s. Abdul Hameed Qureshi brought a revolution in the textile industry by implementing more innovative methods of producing the Himroo fabric.

Work

Rafat Qureshi has written articles, reviews of books in various magazines and newspapers. 
His first book "Mulk-E-Khuda Tangneest" published from Delhi, is a travelogue. The book also contains the world heritage places in Aurangabad, Ajanta, Ellora, as well as local historical sites like Quile-e-Arc built by Aurangzeb and narrates interesting events in the palace. 
However, Rafat Qureshi’s recent book titled "Tazkire Ujaalo Ke" is a book that incorporates different chapters on personalities, translations, reviews, history, and humour, as well as reviews on his work by some of the most celebrated names in Urdu literature.

Sources 
Eastern Book Corporation
Historic cities of India@ Bagchee.com

References 

People from Aurangabad, Maharashtra
Urdu-language writers from India
Living people
People from Marathwada
Year of birth missing (living people)